Jitka Boho, née Válková (born 11 November 1991 in Třebíč) is a Czech singer, former model, and beauty pageant contestant who won Česká Miss 2010 and finished in the top 15 in Miss Universe 2010.

Early life
Originally from Třebíč, Válkova studied at a Catholic Grammar School. She became the sixth Česká Miss and was crowned by Iveta Lutovská, Česká Miss 2009.

Miss Universe 2010
At 18, Válková became one of the youngest contestants to finish in the Top 15 and competed in the swimsuit round during the finals of Miss Universe 2010, held on 23 August 2010 in Paradise, Nevada.

She earned the Czech Republic's fourth consecutive placement in the Miss Universe pageant.

Personal life 
In July 2015 Válková married drummer Lukáš Boho at Měřín and also announced her pregnancy. Their daughter Rozálie was born in November.

References

External links
 Official website
 Válková's profile on Miss Universe Official site

1991 births
Living people
Miss Universe 2010 contestants
Czech beauty pageant winners
21st-century Czech women singers
People from Třebíč
Czech female models
Czech YouTubers